The 2012 Rai Open was a professional tennis tournament played on clay courts. It was the fourth edition of the tournament which was part of the 2012 ATP Challenger Tour. It took place in Rome, Italy between 16 and 22 April 2012.

Singles main draw entrants

Seeds

 1 Rankings are as of April 9, 2012.

Other entrants
The following players received wildcards into the singles main draw:
  Nicola Barraco
  Marco Cecchinato
  Gianluca Naso
  Vincenzo Santopadre

The following players received entry from the qualifying draw:
  Maxime Authom
  Gerard Granollers
  Filip Krajinović
  Pedro Sousa

Champions

Singles

 Roberto Bautista Agut def.  Rui Machado, 6–7 (7–9), 6–4, 6–3

Doubles

 Dustin Brown /  Jonathan Marray def.  Andrei Dăescu /  Florin Mergea, 6–4, 7–6(7–0)

External links
Official Website
ITF Search
ATP official site

Rai Open
Rai Open

es:Challenger de Roma (Rai Open)